There are many dishes considered part of French cuisine. Some dishes are considered universally accepted as part of the national cuisine, while others fit into a unique regional cuisine.  There are also breads, charcuterie items as well as desserts that fit into these categories which are listed accordingly as well.

Common dishes found on a national level
There are many dishes that are considered part of the French national cuisine today. Many come from haute cuisine in the fine-dining realm, but others are regional dishes that have become a norm across the country. Below are lists of a few of the more common dishes available in France on a national level. 
 Chicken Marengo
 Hachis Parmentier
 Jambon-beurre 
 Poulet chasseur

Common bread

 Ficelle – a thin baguette
 Baguette
 Flûte – a thicker baguette
 Boule – a 'ball'
 Pain de campagne
 Pain de mie

Viennoiseries

 Chausson aux pommes
 Chouquette
 Croissant
 Pain au chocolat
 Pain aux raisins
 Pain viennois

Common desserts and pastries

 Brioche
 Bûche de Noël
 Café liégeois'''
 Crème brûlée Croquembouche Croustade aux pommes Éclair Far Breton Fraisier Galette des rois Gateau au yaourt Macarons Madeleine Mille-feuilles Mousse au chocolat Pain perdu Quatre-quarts Saint Honoré SouffléArdennes
 Cacasse à cul nu (Potatoes, onions, and often bacon or sausage, cooked in a Dutch oven)

Lorraine
 Baba au rhum Bouchée à la reine (Shell puff pastry with cream sauce and chicken)
 Crepe et fruit Fuseau lorrain Glace Plombières Pâté lorrain Macarons de Nancy Madeleine (small traditional cake from Commercy with orange blossom)
 Potée Lorraine Quiche Lorraine (traditional tart with bacon, eggs and cheese)
 Tarte à la brimbelle (Myrtille) Tarte aux mirabelles Tête de veau TourteAlsace

 Baeckeoffe Carpe frites Choucroute garnie (sauerkraut with sausages, salt pork and potatoes)
 Coq au Riesling (the local Alsace variant of coq au vin)
 Knack / Saucisse de Strasbourg Kouglof (traditional brioche cake with almonds baked in a special bell shaped mould)
 Presskopf Rosbif à l'alsacienne (horsemeat)
 Spätzle Tarte à l'oignon Tarte flambée / FlammekuecheNormandy
 Matelote (fish stewed in cider)
 Moules à la crème Normande (mussels cooked with white wine, Normandy cider, garlic and cream)
 Tarte Normande (apple tart)
 Teurgoule (a baked rice dessert)
 Tripes à la mode de Caen (tripe cooked in cider and calvados)
  Poulet au cidre et aux carottes de Créances (Spicy chicken in cider with carrots)

Sud-Ouest
 Axoa Confit de canard Foie gras Garbure Magret de canard PiperadeLimousin
 Farcidure Flaugnarde Fondu creusois Pâté aux pommes de terre Tourtous aux rillettes d'oieBrittany

 Crêpes (a very thin type of pancake, often eaten filled with sweet or savory fillings)
 Far Breton (flan with prunes)
 Kig ha farz (boiled pork dinner with buckwheat dumplings)
 Kouign amann (galette made flaky with high proportion of butter)
 Haricots a la Bretonne (Beans, Bretton style)
 Poulet à la bretonne (chicken simmered in apple cider)

Loire Valley/Central France
 Andouillettes (sausage made with chitterlings)
 Rillettes (spreadable paste made from braised meat and rendered fat, similar to pâté)
 Gratin de blettes (spinach beet gratin)

Burgundy

 Bœuf bourguignon (beef stewed in red wine)
 Coq au vin (chicken braised in red wine, lardons and mushrooms)
 Escargots de Bourgogne (snails baked in their shells with parsley butter)
 Gougère (cheese in choux pastry)
 Jambon persillé (also known as Jambon de Pâques, a marbled ham with parsley)
 Oeufs en meurette (poached eggs in a red wine and pepper reduction sauce)
 Pôchouse (pauchouse; fish stewed in red wine)

Rhône-Alpes

 Andouillette (a kind of sausage with tripe)
 Fondue savoyarde (fondue made with cheese and white wine into which cubes of bread are dipped)
 Gratin dauphinois (a traditional regional French dish based on potatoes and crème fraîche)
 Quenelle (flour, butter, eggs, milk and fish, traditionally pike, mixed and poached)
 Raclette (the cheese is melted and served with potatoes, ham and often dried beef)
 Soupe à l'oignon (onion soup based on meat stock, often served gratinéed with cheese on top)
 Tartiflette (a Savoyard gratin with potatoes, Reblochon cheese, cream and pork)
 Gratin de crozets savoyard (A Savoyard dish with square buckwheat pasta "les crozets de Savoie", cheese and ham)

Aveyron/Cantal
 Aligot (mashed potatoes blended with young Tomme cheese)
 Tripoux (tripe 'parcels' in a savoury sauce)
 Pansette de Gerzat (lamb tripe stewed in wine, shallots and blue cheese)
 Salade Aveyronaise (lettuce, tomato, roquefort cheese, walnuts)
 Truffade (potatoes sautéed with garlic and young Tomme cheese)
 Fouace (orange blossom water cake)
 Flaune (crust pastry dough filled with a mixture of eggs, sugar and orange blossom water, it looks like cheesecake)
 Farçous (salt and pepper mince made with pork meal, Swiss chard, parsley, eggs and flour)
 Soupe au fromage (soup with onions, garlic, cabbage, vine, stale bread, salt and pepper)
 Pascade (salted pancake)

Toulousain
 Cassoulet (made with beans, sausages and preserved duck or goose)

Languedoc-Roussillon
 Bourride (white fish stewed with vegetables and wine, garnished with aïoli)
 Brandade de morue (puréed salt cod) 
 Cargolade (Catalan style of escargot)
 Clapassade (lamb ragout with olives, honey and licorice) 
 Encornets farcis (cuttlefish stuffed with sausage meat, herbs)
 Rouille de seiche (squid prepared in a similar way to bourride)
 Trinxat (Catalan cabbage and potatoes)

Provence-Alpes-Côte d'Azur

 Aïoli (sauce made of garlic, olive oil, lemon juice, and egg yolks)
 Bouillabaisse (a stew of mixed Mediterranean fish, tomatoes, and herbs)
 Calisson (famous candy from Aix-en-Provence)
 Chichi (French churro from Marseille)
 Daube provençale (a braised stew of beef, vegetables, garlic, and wine)
 Fougasse (a type of bread, often found with additions such as olives, cheese, or anchovies)
 Gateau des rois (tortell, provençal variant of the king cake with glazed fruit)
 Gibassier (galette made with olive oil and spiced with anise, candied orange peel, and orange flower water, and dusted with baker's sugar)
 Navette (from Marseille)
 Oreilette (beignet eaten during carnival or Christmas)
 Pan-bagnat (sandwich with whole wheat bread, salade, hard boiled eggs, tomatoes, tuna or anchovies and olive oil)
 Panisses Pieds paquets (lambs’ feet and tripe ‘parcels’ in a savoury sauce)
 Pissaladière (an antecedent of the much more popular pizza)
 Pompe à l'huile also called Fouace in Occitan (galette made with olive oil; one of the thirteen desserts of a Provençal Christmas)
 Quince cheese (a jelly-like confection made from the quince fruit)
 Ratatouille (a vegetable stew with olive oil, aubergine, courgette, bell pepper, tomato, onion and garlic)
 Salade Niçoise (various ingredients, but always with black olives and tuna)
 Socca (unleavened crepe made from chickpea flour, common along the Ligurian Sea coast both in France and Italy).
 Soupe au pistou (bean soup served with a pistou (cognate with Italian pesto) of fine-chopped basil, garlic and Parmesan)
 Tapenade (puree or finely chopped olives, capers, anchovies and olive oil)
 Tarte tropézienne (famous tarte from Saint-Tropez)

 Picardie 
 Tarte à l'Badrée (Milk and cream cake)

French cuisine ingredients

French regional cuisines use locally grown vegetables, such as:

 Aubergines 
 Carrots
 Courgettes 
 Haricot verts (a type of French green bean)
 Leeks
 Mushrooms: oyster mushrooms, cèpes (porcini)
 Potatoes
 Shallots
 Truffle
 Turnips

Common fruits include:

 Apples
 Apricots
 Blackberry
 Blackcurrant
 Cherry
 Grape
 Oranges
 Peaches
 Pears
 Plums
 Raspberry
 Redcurrant
 Strawberry
 Tangerines
 Tomatoes

Meats consumed include:

 Beef
 Chicken
 Duck
 Foie gras
 Goose
 Horse
 Mutton and lamb
 Pork
 Quail
 Rabbit
 Squab
 Turkey
 Veal

Eggs are fine quality and often eaten as:

 Hard-boiled with mayonnaise
 Omelette
 Scrambled plain or haute cuisine'' preparation

Fish and seafood commonly consumed include:

 Calamari
 Cod
 Escargot (snails)
 Frog legs
 Herring
 Mussels
 Oysters
 Salmon
 Sardines, canned and fresh
 Shrimp
 Trout
 Tuna, canned and fresh

Herbs and seasonings vary by region and include:

 Fennel
 Fleur de sel
 Herbes de Provence
 Lavender
 Marjoram
 Rosemary
 Sage
 Tarragon
 Thyme

Fresh fruit and vegetables, as well as fish and meat, can be purchased either from supermarkets or specialty shops. Street markets are held on certain days in most localities; some towns have a more permanent covered market enclosing food shops, especially meat and fish retailers. These have better shelter than the periodic street markets.

See also
 List of French cheeses
 List of French desserts
 List of French soups and stews

Notes

References
Newman, Bryan. Behind the French Menu. French cuisine explained, 2013
Steele, Ross. The French Way. 2nd edition. New York: McGraw-Hill, 2006.

Dishes

hu:A francia gasztronómia
zh:法国烹饪